Lin Tsung-hsien or Lin Tsong-shyan (born 22 February 1962) is a Taiwanese politician. He was elected Yilan County Magistrate in 2009 and served until 2017, when he was appointed to lead the Council of Agriculture.

Education and early career
Lin was born in Luodong to a family of farmers, and received his bachelor's degree from Chiayi Agricultural College and master's degree from Fo Guang University. Upon completion of mandatory military service, Lin became an insurance agent.

Political career
Lin became active in Luodong Township's local politics in 1988, having worked his way up to the position of district secretary-general by 1994. In 1998, Lin joined the Democratic Progressive Party. In February 2002, he became the mayor of Luodong Township, serving for two terms until December 2009.

Yilan County Magistracy
Lin assumed the magistracy of Yilan County on 20 December 2009 after winning the 2009 Republic of China local election on 5 December 2009 under the Democratic Progressive Party.

During his first term as county magistrate, Lin improved the county's standing through reform. He also restored the annual Yilan International Children's Folklore and Folkgame Festival which was suspended by his predecessor Lu Kuo-hua. Lin had also supported several agricultural policies, such as banning chemical herbicides in farms and ending the use of unprocessed manure as fertilizer. In terms of housing development, he had created regulations on farmhouses and reduced the number of residential buildings permitted on farmland.

On 29 November 2014, Lin won the Yilan County magistrate election as the DPP candidate.

In his second term, Lin supported Ko Wen-je's proposal to build a railway connecting Yilan and Taipei. However, the project drew harsh criticism for its predicted negative effects on the environment.

Minister of Agriculture
Lin was appointed the head of the Council of Agriculture in February 2017. He resigned the position on 1 December 2018.

References

Magistrates of Yilan County, Taiwan
Living people
1962 births
Democratic Progressive Party (Taiwan) politicians
Taiwanese Ministers of Agriculture
People from Luodong, Yilan County, Taiwan